Deepak Joon (born 26 November 1982) is an Indian cricketer. He played in twelve first-class matches for Haryana from 2004 to 2007. He then played a further seven first-class matches in New Zealand for Wellington in 2015.

See also
 List of Wellington representative cricketers

References

External links
 

1982 births
Living people
Indian cricketers
Haryana cricketers
Wellington cricketers
People from Jhajjar